Law and Lead is a 1936 American Western film directed by Robert F. Hill.

Cast 
Rex Bell as Jimmy Sawyer
Hal Taliaferro as Steve Bradley, posing as The Juarez Kid
Harley Wood as Hope Hawley
Earl Dwire as Dad Hawley
Soledad Jiménez as Señora Gonzales
Donald Reed as Pancho Gonzales, aka The Juarez Kid
Roger Williams as Card cheat
Lane Chandler as Cattleman Detective Ned

External links 

1936 films
1936 Western (genre) films
1930s action adventure films
American black-and-white films
American Western (genre) films
American action adventure films
1930s English-language films
Films directed by Robert F. Hill
1930s American films